Ravi Kunte is a former badminton player. He was the national doubles champion.
He was the bronze medalist in badminton at the 1986 Asian Games in the Men's team event.

References

Living people
Year of birth missing (living people)
Indian male badminton players
Indian national badminton champions
Asian Games medalists in badminton
Asian Games bronze medalists for India
Badminton players at the 1986 Asian Games
Medalists at the 1986 Asian Games